Antoine Bournonville (19 May 1760 – 11 January 1843) was a French ballet dancer a choreographer, active in the Royal Swedish Ballet and the Royal Danish Ballet and eventually ballet master in the latter.  He is considered to have played a great role in the development of the ballet in Scandinavia. He was the father of August Bournonville.

Early life
Bournonville was the son of the actors Louis-Amable Bournonville and Jeanne Evrard, born as the twin of his brother Guillame. He became the student of Noverre in 1769, at the age of nine, and toured in Vienna, Paris and London before he was employed in the Royal Swedish Ballet at the Royal Swedish Opera in Stockholm with his sister Julie Alix de la Fay in 1782.

Career

Sweden 
Bournonville was premier dancer and ballet instructor at the Royal Swedish Opera in Stockholm until 1792. During his time in Sweden, he was described as beautiful as Apollo: "His appearance was that of a true Apollo. On top of that he had a form of virtuosity in all kinds of dance, which he used with the finest taste". King Gustav III of Sweden was at one point so enthusiastic about his performance and beauty that he called out to him to untie the ribbon of his hair so that he could see his loose hair fly during his pirouette.

His favourite student and dancing partner in Sweden was Charlotte Slottsberg, with whom he made a successful pair in the ballets. It was Antoine Bournonville himself who asked to have her as his partner, after he recognized her talent as an artist and, in 1784, by his own initiative gave her a part in Les Meunieres Provencaux, which is considered to have been the starting point of Slottberg's true maturity as an artist. Charlotte Slottsberg was said to have been infatuated by his beauty, which at one occasion made her lover, Prince Charles to scream at Bournonville in his jealousy.

He was also active as an actor, a singer and a choreographer. During his stay in Sweden he wrote the ballets Les Meuniers provençaux (1785) and  Les Pêcheurs (1789).

Denmark 
He left Sweden in 1792 after the assassination of king Gustav III of Sweden and was employed at the Royal Danish Ballet in Copenhagen in Denmark after a guest performance there. His favourite dance partner in Denmark was Marie Christine Björn. In 1816–1823, he was the ballet master of the Royal Danish Ballet.

Private life
Bournonville was married first to the Danish dancer Mariane Jensen, second to his Swedish housekeeper Lovisa Sundberg (the mother of August Bournonville) and also had a child with the Danish dancer Karen Olsen.

He died on 11 January 1843 and is buried in Asminderød Churchyard in Fredensborg.

References

Further reading
Svensk Uppslagsbok (Swedish dictionary) 1947 års utgåva (1947 year edition) 
Lars Löfgren : Svensk teater (Swedish theatre) 
Nordisk familjebok 

Entertainers from Lyon
1760 births
1843 deaths
French male ballet dancers
18th-century French ballet dancers
French ballet masters
Gustavian era people
Royal Swedish Ballet dancers
Royal Danish Ballet dancers